Thomas Cook (died after 1412) was the member of the Parliament of England for Marlborough for the parliament of 1399.

References 

Members of Parliament for Marlborough
English MPs 1399
14th-century English politicians
Year of birth unknown
Year of death unknown